Save the Last Dance for Me is a 20-episode South Korean television series that aired on SBS from October 23, 2004 to January 2, 2005 on Saturdays and Sundays at 21:45. Starring Eugene, Ji Sung, Ryu Soo-young and Lee Bo-young. The drama revolves around two lovers who don't let amnesia get in the way of their romance.

Plot
Hyun-woo (Ji Sung) is the reluctant heir to his father's chemical company and engaged to be married to Soo-jin (Lee Bo-young). Eun-soo (Eugene) lives a simple life, running a bed and breakfast with her elderly father. Their paths cross one fateful night when, after a failed attempt on his life, Hyun-woo loses his memory in a car accident. Discovered on the roadside by Eun-soo and her father, they take him in, nursing him back to health. Over the course of his recovery, Eun-soo and Hyun-woo (whom she has named "Baek Chang-ho") fall in love.

On the day of their engagement, Eun-soo's father passes away. Following another attempt on Hyun-woo's life and a resulting accident, Hyun-woo regains his memory but forgets the year he spent with Eun-soo and leaves her to seek out his past life.

Eun-soo, in her determination to find her lost love, travels to the city where she meets Hyun-woo, who, in turn, gradually falls in love with her again. A close confidant of Hyun-woo, Tae-min, is revealed as a traitor seeking to gain control of Hyun-woo's company. Tae-min is ultimately exposed and Hyun-woo regains ownership of the company.

In a final, desperate attempt to get revenge on Hyun-woo, Tae-min tries to run him over, but instead of Hyun-woo, Eun-soo shows up and this accident paralyzes her from waist down. Refusing to be a burden to Hyun-woo, Eun-soo disappears to work as a teacher at a home for physically challenged children, until after a year of searching, Hyun-woo sees a familiar drawing, and the lovers reunite. The final credits show Eun-soo learning to walk again with Hyun-woo's assistance.

Cast

Main characters
Eugene as Ji Eun-soo 
Eun-soo falls in love with Hyun-woo while helping him recover his memory and they were engaged to be married before he vanishes. She searches for him and works in his company, determined to try to get him to remember the time he spent with her.
Ji Sung as Kang Hyun-woo 
Hyun-woo is the heir to a large Korean conglomerate. He loses his memory after a failed attempt on his life by Tae-min, a rival who wants control of the company. He is affectionately called "Baek Chang-ho" by Eun-soo when he could not recall his name.
Ryu Soo-young as Jung Tae-min 
Tae-min is a confidant of Hyun-woo's father. He is loyal to the family and is a hardworking guy but there's more to him than meets the eye. Every decision he makes is a ploy to deceive Hyun-woo's family in order to take control of the company. He falls in love with Eun-soo in the middle of the drama.
Lee Bo-young as Yoon Soo-jin 
Soo-jin was Hyun-woo's fiancée-to-be. Even after the "death" of Hyun-woo, she's still devoted to him and waited for his return. At first she was nice and caring, until Eun-soo steps into the picture which drove Soo-jin to the point where she tries to commit suicide.

Supporting characters
 Lee Hye-young as Kang Hyun-jung
 Kim Mu-saeng as Chairman Kang
 Kim Young-ran as Ms. Park
 Park In-hwan as Eun-soo's father
 Kim Min-jung  as Ms. Oh
 Kim Min-joo as Ahn Jang-mi
 Ahn Sun-young as Choo Sun-young
 Suh Kyung Suk as Park Ho-jin
 Kim Hong-pyo as Choi Suk-koo
 Kang Ji-hwan as Shin Jung-kyu
 Shin Kwi-sik as Yoon Ui-won
 Kim Hyung-ja as Ms. Son Yoo-rim
 Kim Byung-ki as Boss Joo

Remakes
There are three unofficial remakes: Indonesia's Aku Bukan Untukmu ("I'm not for you") in 2005; Taiwan's The Prince Who Turns into a Frog in 2005; and Mainland China's Waking Love Up in 2011.

References

External links
  
 Save the Last Dance for Me at SBS Global
 
 

Seoul Broadcasting System television dramas
2004 South Korean television series debuts
2005 South Korean television series endings
Korean-language television shows
South Korean romance television series
Television series by Logos Film